Hoplistopus is a genus of moths in the family Sphingidae. The genus was erected by Walter Rothschild and Karl Jordan in 1903.

Species
Hoplistopus butti (Rothschild & Jordan 1903)
Hoplistopus penricei (Rothschild & Jordan 1903)

References

Sphingini
Moth genera
Taxa named by Walter Rothschild
Taxa named by Karl Jordan